Parc Borély is a public municipal park in the city of Marseille, France.  It is classified by the Ministry of Culture as one of the Remarkable Gardens of France. The park is 17 hectares in size.  It adjoins the Jardin botanique E.M. Heckel.

Description

Parc Borély has three different gardens;  a Garden à la française, facing the bastide, composed of a two lawns, a circular basin and a rectangual basin, and double rows of trees, between the avenue du Prado and the gates of the park:

An English landscape garden, on the east side of the park, surrounding a lake,  and decorated with statues, fountain, a cascade, and a playground.  It also featured a miniature of the basilica of Notre-Dame de la Garde.

A recently renovated race track.  The other two parts of the garden connect to the sea by a promenade and to the neighboring botanical garden.

History 
The park was created in the 17th century by a French ship owner and merchant, Joseph Borely, who bought land for a country house, the Château Borély, in the area of Marseille called Bonneveine.  The estate was enlarged in the 18th century by Joseph Borély, who constructed a bastide, or Provençal country house, on the domaine.  When Louis-Joseph Borély inherited the domaine in 1770, he commissioned the landscape architect Embry to create a Garden à la française.

In the middle of the 19th century, the land passed first to Paulin Talabot, director of the new PLM railroad which connected Paris to Marseille;  and then the land was acquired by the city of Marseille.  The city commissioned landscape architect Jean-Charles Adolphe Alphand to design a park with three distinct parts;  a French garden, an English landscape park, and a track for horse racing by the side of the sea.   A number of wooden pavilions were constructed;  just one remains, the former pavilion by the lake, which had also served as a botanical laboratory of the Institut Colonial.

From 1880 until 1915, the park was the site of a botanical garden, which moved to a different site adjoining the park.  In 2002, a promenade of two hectares was laid out between the park and sea.

Sources 
 Page on the official site of the French Committee of Parks and Gardens

Buildings and structures in Marseille
Geography of Marseille
Borely, Parc
Provence
Tourist attractions in Marseille